DTUsat (COSPAR 2003-031C) was a CubeSat built by students from the Technical University of Denmark. It was launched on 30 June 2003 from the Plesetsk Cosmodrome on a Rockot launcher. Contact with the satellite was never established.

See also 
 List of CubeSats

External links
 Official homepage

Student satellites
CubeSats